Blanche Azoulay was the first woman to become a lawyer in Algeria, upon being called to the Bar of Algiers in 1908.

References 

Year of birth missing
Year of death missing
20th-century Algerian lawyers
Algerian women lawyers